The Ascobolaceae are a family of fungi in the order Pezizales. A 2008 estimate places 6 genera and 129 species in the family.

Description
Most fruiting bodies of the disk-like ascobolaceae examined, are round and without conidium. All members of this family of fungi have a saprobiontic lifestyle, feeding on decaying and dead matter.

Taxonomy
 Ascobolaceae with 4 different genera
 Ascobolus
 Cubonia
 Saccobolus
 Thecotheus

Examples
Ascobolus michaudii and Ascobolus albidus live as decomposers on the feces of large herbivore and omnivore mammals and depend on their survival, due to the specialized habitat they inhabit.

References

Pezizales
Ascomycota families